Sylvester Nevins was a member of the Wisconsin State Senate.

Biography
Nevins was born in New York City. He graduated from Middlebury College. In 1859, Nevins moved to La Crosse, Wisconsin. Additionally, he also lived in Sherwood (town), Wisconsin. He died in 1901. Nevins, Wisconsin is named after him.

Career
Nevins represented the 31st District in the Senate during the 1875 and 1876 sessions. Previously, he had been a La Crosse alderman in 1871, 1872 and 1873 and a candidate for Mayor of La Crosse in 1874. He was a Republican.

References

Politicians from New York City
Politicians from La Crosse, Wisconsin
People from Clark County, Wisconsin
Republican Party Wisconsin state senators
Wisconsin city council members
Middlebury College alumni
1901 deaths
Year of birth missing